Prince of Wales is a title traditionally given to the heir apparent to the English and later British throne. Prior to the conquest of Wales by Edward I in the 13th century, it was used by the rulers of independent Wales.

The first Welsh prince of Wales was Owain ap Gruffydd (also known as Owain Gwynedd or Owain the Great), King of Gwynedd, who first titled himself as such in a letter to Louis VII of France in 1165.

Llywelyn the Great is typically regarded as the strongest leader, holding power over the vast majority of Wales for 45 years. One of the last independent princes was Llywelyn ap Gruffydd (Llywelyn the Last), who was killed at the Battle of Orewin Bridge in 1282. His brother, Dafydd ap Gruffydd, was executed the following year. After these two deaths, and the establishment of English rule over all of Wales, Edward I of England invested his son Edward of Caernarfon as the first English prince of Wales in 1301. The title was later claimed by the heir of Gwynedd, Owain Glyndŵr (Owain ap Gruffydd), from 1400 until 1415 (date of his assumed death) who led Welsh forces against the English. Since then, it has only been held by the heir apparent of the English and subsequently British monarch. The title is a subject of controversy in Wales.

The incumbent, William, received the title on 9 September 2022, the day after his father's accession to the throne as Charles III.

Native princes of Wales

Before prince of Wales 

While many different Welsh rulers claimed the title of 'King of Wales' and some ruled a majority of the country, the modern-day territory was only fully united between 1055 and 1063, under the direct rule of Gruffydd ap Llywelyn, who was referred to as 'King of Wales' or Rex Walensium by John of Worcester.

The native use of the title 'Prince of Wales' appeared more frequently by the eleventh century as a modernised form of the old 'King of the Britons', a title used to describe the leader of the Celtic Britons, ancestors of the Welsh. The princes of the medieval period hailed largely from west Wales, mainly Gwynedd. They had significant power which allowed them to claim authority beyond the borders of their kingdoms.

End of native princes of Wales 
Following the uniting of Wales under the rule of the Llywelyn princes, Edward I of England led 15,000 men to capture Wales. Resistance was led by Llywelyn ap Gruffydd who was killed by English soldiers in an ambush trick at the Battle of Orewin Bridge. Llywelyn's brother, Dafydd ap Gruffydd, took over leadership of Welsh fighters, but was captured and executed in 1283.

After the deaths of Llywelyn and Dafydd, King Edward introduced the royal ordinance of the Statute of Rhuddlan in 1284. The statute was a constitutional change causing Wales to lose its de facto independence and formed the Principality of Wales within the Realm of England. Almost two decades later, Edward appointed his son and heir, Edward of Caernarfon, as prince of Wales.

Owain Glyndŵr 

With the assassination of Owain Lawgoch in 1378, the senior line of the House of Aberffraw (descended from Llywelyn the Great in patrilineal succession) became extinct. As a result, the claim of the title 'Prince of Wales' fell to the other royal dynasties of Wales, namely Deheubarth and Powys. The leading heir in this respect was Owain Glyndŵr who was descended from both dynasties.

Glyndŵr was announced as prince of Wales in Glyndyfrdwy on 16 September 1400, and with his armies, he proceeded to attack English towns in north-east Wales. Henry IV led several attempted invasions but with limited success, while Owain solidified his control of the nation.

However, in 1407, the much larger and better equipped English forces began to overwhelm the Welsh and by 1409 they had reconquered most of the region. Glyndŵr fought on until he was cornered and under siege at Harlech Castle. He managed to escape and retreated to the Welsh wilderness with a band of loyal supporters, where he refused to surrender and continued the war with guerrilla tactics. The last documented sighting of Owain Glyndŵr was in 1412 and his death was recorded by a former follower in the year 1415.

Arms

Llywelyn ap Gruffydd 
Three native princes of Wales used the House of Gwynedd arms. The House of Gwynedd is divided between the earlier House of Cunedda, which lasted from c. 420–825, and the later House of Aberffraw, beginning in 844.

Owain Glyndŵr 

Owain Glyndŵr adapted the House of Gwynedd arms by making the lions rampant, making clear his descent from the princes of Gwynedd and Llywelyn the Last, and his defence of Wales. It is also suggested that this design was influenced by the arms of Powys Fadog and the coat of Deheubarth. Glyndŵr's father was a hereditary prince of Powys Fadog and his mother was noblewoman of Deheubarth.

The Glyndŵr arms were also used as a banner, carried into battle against the English. This banner is a symbol of Welsh defiance, resilience and protest, and is associated with Welsh nationhood.

As title of the English and British heir apparent 

Since 1301 the prince of Wales has usually been the eldest living son (only if he is also the heir apparent) of the King or Queen Regnant of England (subsequently of Great Britain, 1707, and of the United Kingdom, 1801).

The title is neither automatic or heritable; it merges with the Crown when its holder eventually accedes to the throne, or reverts to the Crown if its holder predeceases the current monarch, leaving the sovereign free to grant it to the new heir apparent (such as the late prince's son or brother).

William Camden's Britannia describes the beginning of the English prince of Wales as heir apparent after Llywelyn ap Gruffydd was "slain":

In 2011, along with the other Commonwealth realms, the United Kingdom committed to the Perth Agreement, which proposed changes to the laws governing succession, including altering the male-preference primogeniture to absolute primogeniture. The Succession to the Crown Act 2013 was introduced to the British parliament on 12 December 2012, published the next day, and received royal assent on 25 April 2013. It was brought into force on 26 March 2015, at the same time as the other realms implemented the Perth Agreement in their own laws.

Titles and roles 
After the conquest, 'Prince of Wales' has been a substantive title traditionally (but not necessarily) granted by the English or British monarch to the son or grandson who is the heir apparent to the throne.

Since 1301, the title 'Earl of Chester' has generally been granted to each heir apparent to the English throne, and from the late 14th century it has been given only in conjunction with that of 'Prince of Wales'. Both titles are bestowed to each individual by the sovereign and are not automatically acquired.

The prince of Wales usually has other titles and honours, if the eldest son of the monarch; typically this means being duke of Cornwall, which, unlike being prince of Wales, inherently includes lands and constitutional and operational responsibilities. The duchy of Cornwall was created in 1337 by Edward III for his son and heir, Edward of Woodstock (also known as 'The Black Prince'). A charter was also created which ruled that the eldest son of the king would be the duke of Cornwall.

No formal public role or responsibility has been legislated by Parliament or otherwise delegated to the prince of Wales by law or custom. In that role, Charles often assisted Elizabeth II in the performance of her duties. He represented her when welcoming dignitaries to London and during state visits. He also represented the Queen and the United Kingdom overseas at state and ceremonial occasions such as funerals. The prince of Wales has also been granted the authority to issue royal warrants.

British (formerly English) insignia

As heir apparent to the sovereign, the prince of Wales bears the royal arms differenced by a white label of three points. To represent Wales he bears the coat of arms of the Principality of Wales, crowned with the heir apparent's crown, on an inescutcheon-en-surtout. This was first used by the future Edward VIII in 1910, and followed by the most recent prince of Wales, now King Charles III.

The heraldic badge of the three feathers is the badge of the duke of Cornwall, or heir apparent to the British throne. The ostrich feathers heraldic motif is generally traced back to Edward of Woodstock ('The Black Prince'). He bore (as an alternative to his differenced royal arms) a shield of Sable, three ostrich feathers argent, described as his "shield for peace", probably meaning the shield he used for jousting. These arms appear several times on his chest tomb in Canterbury Cathedral, alternating with his paternal royal arms (the royal arms of King Edward III differenced by a label of three points argent). The Black Prince also used heraldic badges of one or more ostrich feathers in various other contexts.

Opposition to the title 

While Prince Charles's 1969 investiture was "largely welcomed" in Wales, and it was watched by 19 million in the UK and another 500 million around the world, protests described as an anti-investiture movement, also took place in the days leading up to the ceremony. Multiple Welsh organisations and individuals were against the event, including Dafydd Iwan, Edward Millward, Cofia 1282 ('Remember 1282'), and the Welsh Language Society. On the day of the investiture, a few protesters were arrested.

Since then, further prominent organisations and figures in Wales have called for an end to the title including Plaid Cymru (which has since changed its stance), Republic, Michael Sheen, and Dafydd Elis-Thomas. Following Charles III's accession to the throne in September 2022, a petition was launched calling for the abolition of the title "Prince of Wales", which had received over 35,000 signatures. Mark Drakeford, Adam Price, Jane Dodds, and YesCymru have all acknowledged a potential for a debate or have suggested potential for Welsh decision. On 6 October 2022, Gwynedd Council, the local authority where Charles was invested, voted to declare opposition to the title of 'Prince of Wales' and against holding another investiture in Wales.

Opinion polls 
A BBC Wales poll in 1999 found that 73% of Welsh speakers wanted the position of Prince of Wales to continue. 

A BBC poll in 2009, marking the 40th anniversary of the investiture, indicated that 38% of the Welsh population was in favour of a similar public ceremony for Prince William after Prince Charles became king.

An ITV poll in 2018 found 57% of Welsh people in support of the title passing on when the then prince became king, with 27% opposed. Support for a similar investiture was lower, with 31% supporting, 27% opposed and 18% wanting a different kind of investiture.

List of princes of Wales (English or British heirs apparent) 

The current sovereign Charles III was the longest serving prince of Wales for 64 years and 44 days between 1958 and 2022. He was also heir apparent for longer than any other in British history. Upon the death of his mother on 8 September 2022, Charles became king and the title merged with the Crown. The following day, King Charles III bestowed the title upon his elder son, Prince William, Duke of Cornwall and Cambridge.

Family tree

See also
 Princess of Wales
 Prince of Wales's feathers
 List of heirs to the British throne
 List of heirs to the English throne
 Prince's Consent

References

Sources

External links

 The Prince of Wales (official website until 2022) which includes a list of and history of previous Princes of Wales since Llewelyn ap Gruffydd (aka Llewelyn the Last)

 
Prince of Wales
Wales
Wales
Wales
Heirs to the throne
Wales, Prince of
Lists of princes